Mingaladon Township is located in the northernmost part of Yangon, Myanmar. The township comprises 31 wards, and shares borders with Hmawbi Township in the north, North Okkalapa Township in the east, Insein Township and Shwepyitha Township in the west, and Mayangon Township in the south. Mingaladon is still relatively undeveloped and lacks basic municipal services.

Mingaladon is home to the Yangon International Airport and the Hlawga National Park

Etymology
The Burmese place name Mingaladon is a portmanteau of two words: Pali mangala ("blessed") and Mon  ("town").

Climate

Transport
Mingaladon's Aung Mingala Bus Terminal serves all the highway buses to all major cities and towns in the country, except for those in the Ayeyarwady Division.

Mingaladon Air Base

Mingaladon is home to an air base (ICAO: VYHB) of the Myanmar Air Force. Formerly called 502 Air Base.

Education
The University of Computer Studies, Yangon, one of the country's best universities, is located in the western part of the township on the west bank of Hlawga National Park. The township is also home to the Defence Services Institute of Nursing and Paramedical Science.

References

Townships of Yangon